Alexey Vladimirovich Rybalkin (born 16 November 1993) is a Russian cyclist, who most recently rode for UCI ProTeam . He was named in the start list for the 2016 Giro d'Italia.

Major results

2011
 5th Road race, UEC European Junior Road Championships
2013
 10th Vuelta a la Comunidad de Madrid
2014
 3rd Overall Tour de l'Avenir
 4th Overall Vuelta a Castilla y León
 4th Overall Volta a Portugal do Futuro
1st  Mountains classification
2015
 1st Young rider classification Vuelta a la Comunidad de Madrid
 1st  Young rider classification Volta a Portugal
2017
 8th Overall Tour of Austria
2018
 2nd Overall Sibiu Cycling Tour
2019
 5th Overall Tour de l'Ain

Grand Tour general classification results timeline

References

External links

1993 births
Living people
Russian male cyclists
21st-century Russian people